Iulian Mihu (3 November 1926 – 20 June 1999) was a Romanian film director. He directed nineteen films between 1953 and 1998. His 1981 film The Pale Light of Sorrow was entered into the 12th Moscow International Film Festival, where it won a Special Diploma.

Selected filmography
 Felix și Otilia (1972)
 The Pale Light of Sorrow (1981)

References

External links

1926 births
1999 deaths
Romanian film directors
Film people from Bucharest